Cenodocus is a genus of longhorn beetles of the subfamily Lamiinae, containing the following species:

 Cenodocus antennatus J. Thomson, 1864
 Cenodocus borneensis Gilmour & Breuning, 1963
 Cenodocus granulosus Pascoe, 1866
 Cenodocus laosensis Breuning, 1964

References

Pteropliini